National Coalition / Independent Candidates (NK/NEKA), formerly known as Party of Democratic Slovakia and National Coalition, is a Slovak conservative political party founded in 2014 by the former politician of the ĽS-HZDS movement Sergej Kozlík. The party profiles itself in three pillars – national, Christian and social. Since October 2021, Rudolf Huliak has been the chairman of the party. Before the 2020 parliamentary election, the National Coalition joined the electoral coalition with the far-right People's Party Our Slovakia party, but did not win any mandate in the National Council.

History 
In the 2019 presidential election, the party expressed support for Štefan Harabin. In the 2019 European Parliament election, Štefan Harabin's nephew Slavomír Harabin ran for the National Coalition. The party received only 0.72% of the vote and did not win any seats.

In November 2019, the NATIONAL COALITION became one of the small Slovak political parties that signed a memorandum on the cooperation of "pro-national and Christian forces" for the upcoming parliamentary elections with the People's Party Our Slovakia. A de jure coalition was not created, the Kotleba party only freed up a certain number of seats on their candidate list for other parties. NK won 10 places on the candidate list, the highest place was chairwoman Slavěna Vorobelová in 16th place. Thanks to the higher number of rings, three other candidates got ahead of her, and she remained at the gates of the parliament from the 19th place overall after Danica Mikovčáková's mandate was given up as the first substitute. Despite being a member of the Kotlebist coalition, the party did not win a seat in the National Council .

Electoral results

Parliamentary elections 

* the politicians of the National Coalition ran on the ĽSNS candidate list, none of the elected deputies represent NK.

European Parliament elections 

**compared to ĽS-HZDS

References

External links 

 Official party website
 NATIONAL COALITION / INDEPENDENT CANDIDATES in the party register of the Ministry of the Interior of the Slovak Republic

Political parties established in 2014
Political parties in Slovakia
Nationalist parties in Slovakia
Conservative parties in Slovakia
2014 establishments in Slovakia